Don Ya Nang Halt is a railway halt located in Don Ya Nang Subdistrict, Phachi District, Phra Nakhon Si Ayutthaya.

Train services 
 Ordinary No. 207/208 Bangkok- Nakhon Sawan- Bangkok
 Ordinary No. 209/210 Bangkok- Ban Takhli- Bangkok
 Commuter No. 301/302 Bangkok- Lop Buri- Bangkok (weekends only)
 Commuter No. 303 Bangkok- Lop Buri (weekdays only)
 Commuter No. 315 Bangkok- Lop Buri (weekdays only)
 Commuter No. 318 Lop Buri- Bangkok (weekdays only)

References 

Railway stations in Thailand